The James Webb House is a property in Triune, Tennessee that dates from c.1850 and that was listed on the National Register of Historic Places (NRHP) in 1988.  It has also been known as Kirkview Farm.

It includes Greek Revival and Italianate architecture.

It is one of about thirty fine antebellum brick and frame residences in Williamson County that survive and that were built as centers of slave plantations.  It is among several "notable two-story frame residences" built in the eastern part of the county;  another is the Samuel B. Lee House of Maplewood Farm.  The NRHP eligibility of the property was covered in a 1988 study of Williamson County historical resources.

References

Houses on the National Register of Historic Places in Tennessee
Houses in Williamson County, Tennessee
Greek Revival houses in Tennessee
Italianate architecture in Tennessee
Houses completed in 1850
National Register of Historic Places in Williamson County, Tennessee